Rhiann Kate O'Donnell (born 14 April 1998) is an Australian cricketer who plays for Melbourne Renegades in the Women's Big Bash League (WBBL). An all-rounder, she bats right-handed and bowls right-arm medium pace.

O'Donnell was previously part of the Renegades squad for the 2017–18 WBBL, but she did not make an appearance and joined Hobart Hurricanes for the 2018–19 season. She played six matches, taking two wickets and scoring nine runs before being released ahead of the 2019–20 season. Following a "fantastic" Victorian Premier Cricket season, she was re-signed by the Renegades for the 2021–22 WBBL.

In the WNCL, O'Donnell was signed by Victoria ahead of the 2017–18 season. She made her Victoria debut on 9 November 2018, taking two wickets but scoring a duck. She played four matches in 2018–19 and three in 2019–20 before being released from her state contract.

References

External links

Rhiann O'Donnell at Cricket Australia

Living people
1998 births
People from Mildura
Cricketers from Victoria (Australia)
Sportswomen from Victoria (Australia)
Australian women cricketers
Hobart Hurricanes (WBBL) cricketers
Melbourne Renegades (WBBL) cricketers
Victoria women cricketers